Lost & Found is the second studio album by Australian singer Melissa Tkautz, released in 2005.

Background

In early 2005, Melissa Tkautz appeared at Sydney nightclub ARQ for the venue's Retrosexual theme night, where she sang reworked versions of her hit songs "Read My Lips" and "Sexy (Is The Word)". Following the performance, JRB Music & Management signed Tkautz to a new recording contract.

In the following months, Tkautz recorded her first new single in over ten years - a cover of the Prince-produced, Sheila E song, "The Glamorous Life" which debuted at Number 6 on both the ARIA Dance Chart and the ARIA Australasian Chart and reached Number 8 on the ARIA Club Chart.

The follow-up single "All I Want" was released in November 2005.

Lost & Found was released in Australia a month later, on December 4. A number of tracks on the album were co-written by Tkautz and produced by Paul Wiltshire (Backstreet Boys, Anthony Callea).

Track listing

"All I Want" – 5:30
"Southern Son" – 5:48
"Breakaway" – 4:54
"True Love" – 4:29
"The Glamorous Life" – 3:20
"Blink" – 7:09
"Waiting" – 4:22
"Lies" – 4:15
"Gotta Know" – 3:32
"Goodbye Daddy" – 3:25
"Sexy Is The Word 05*" (Radio Edit) – 4:09
"Sexy Is The Word 05*" (Club Version) – 7:09

Notes

M. Tkautz/Control/P.Wiltshire/Mushroom
Mushroom Music/Hebbes Music
Tkautz/Control/P.Wiltshire/Orient Pacific/R.Sedky/Standard
P.Wiltshire/Orient Pacific/R.Cattania/Control
J.Star/MCA
M.Tkautz/Control/D.Steele/Control
K.Minshull/Orient Pacific/P.Wiltshire/Mushroom
M.Tkautz/Control/P.Wiltshire/Orient Pacific/R.Sedky/Standard
M.Tkautz/Control/P.Wiltshire/Mushroom
M.Tkautz/Control/P.Wiltshire/Mushroom
A.King, R.Nilcholson, J.Berger, F.Koch./Orient Pacific
A.King, R.Nilcholson, J.Berger, F.Koch./Orient Pacific
Sexy 05 Remixes by Steve Peach

Chart positions

Credits

Personnel

Guitar: Mario Riccioni, Robert John Sedky
Backing vocal: Paul Wiltshire

Singles

"The Glamorous Life" was the first single from the forthcoming album Lost & Found. After its Australian release on September 4, 2005, the single reached #31 on the ARIA Singles Chart, #6 on the ARIA Club Chart and #8 on the ARIA Dance Chart. The single also charted in Russia, reaching #20 on the Russian Chart Power Top 50.
"All I Want" was the second single from Lost & Found, released on November 20, 2005. It reached #72 on the ARIA Singles Chart, but peaked at #10 on the ARIA Dance Chart, #19 on the ARIA Australasian Chart and #28 on the ARIA Club Chart.

See also 

 Fresh Album (1992)

References

External links 
 Album lyrics – other site with lyrics to the songs that appear on Lost & Found.
 JRB Music & Management Site.
 Big Records Site.
 Sanity - Virtual Store.

Melissa Tkautz albums
2005 albums